The men's 800 metres event at the 1981 Summer Universiade was held at the Stadionul Naţional in Bucharest on 25 and 26 July 1981.

Medalists

Results

Heats
Held on 25 July

Semifinals
Held on 26 July

Final
Held on 26 July

References

Athletics at the 1981 Summer Universiade
1981